Next Steps in Strategic Partnership (NSSP) is a diplomatic initiative announced in January 2004 between the United States and India on cooperation in strategic areas such as nuclear, space, missile defence, hi-tech trade and commerce, and military.

References

India–United States relations
2004 establishments in India
2004 establishments in the United States
2004 in international relations